John Lynes (6 June 1872 – date of death unknown) was an English cricketer.  Lynes was a right-handed batsman who bowled right-arm fast-medium.  He was born at Coleshill, Warwickshire.

Lynes made his first-class debut for Warwickshire against Derbyshire at Edgbaston in the 1897 County Championship.  He made seven further first-class appearances for the county, the last of which came against Surrey in the 1905 County Championship.  In his eight first-class matches, he took 15 wickets at a bowling average of 38.40, with best figures of 3/54.  With the bat, he scored 79 runs at an average of 9.87, with a high score of 26.

References

External links
John Lynes at ESPNcricinfo
John Lynes at CricketArchive

1872 births
Year of death unknown
People from Coleshill, Warwickshire
English cricketers
Warwickshire cricketers